Spencers Grove is an unincorporated community in Benton County, Iowa, United States.

History
Spencers Grove was originally the fruit grove of Abner N. Spencer.

References

Unincorporated communities in Benton County, Iowa
Unincorporated communities in Iowa